Villamagna may refer to:

Villamagna, a municipality in the province of Chieti, Italy
Villamagna, Bagno a Ripoli, a village in the Metropolitan city of Florence, Italy
Villamagna, Volterra, a village in the province of Pisa, Italy
Villamagna in Proconsulari, an ancient Roman settlement in Africa and former bishopric
Villamagna in Tripolitania, an ancient Roman settlement in Africa and former bishopric
Villa Magna, an ancient imperial Roman villa in Lazio, Italy
Villa Magna Condominiums, an urban development in Miami, Florida